Blood is a 2014 album by the German electro-industrial band Project Pitchfork. It is their 15th studio album and was released in multiple formats, including a double-disc limited edition, featuring two B-sides and three remixes. A music video for "Blood-Diamond (See Him Running)" was released on October, 19th 2014.

Track listing

"Blood-Line (Never)" – 5:49
"Blood-Loss (Sometimes)" – 4:02
"Blood-Stained (Give Me Your Body)" – 4:22
"Blood-Money (No More)" – 4:00
"Blood-Moon (Romance)" – 4:50
"Blood-Diamond (See Him Running)" – 5:41
"Blood-Pressure (Just For My Pleasure)" – 4:43
"Blood-Shed (Dark River)" – 4:51
"Blood-Game (For You)" – 4:29
"Blood-Lust (Mental Island)" – 5:01
"Blood-Stream (Will I Be)" – 4:18

Limited 2CD Special Edition
"Blood-Night" – 5:50
"Blood-Thirst" – 4:35
"Blood-Stained (RMX)" – 5:15
"Blood-Money (RMX)" – 6:20
"Blood-Line (RMX)" – 6:32

Limited 2CD Special Edition
Limited 2CD Deluxe Edition was strictly limited to 2,000 copies and includes:

•    Opulent double CD

•    Hardback book

•    Black front and rear endpapers

•    40 pages, (14 x 21 cm approx)

•    Booklet consisting of paper and blood red, transparent foil

•    High grade art print on high quality art paper with durable thread stitching

•    Booklet includes all lyrics and additional artwork

•    Two exclusive tracks

•    Three exclusive remixes

References

2014 albums
Project Pitchfork albums